South Africa is a regular participant at the World Rugby Sevens Series and has traditionally been a very strong team in rugby sevens.

Positions

1999–2000

2000-2003

2006–2011

2011–2015

2015–present

Facts 
 South Africa has never won a title in Hong Kong.
 South Africa's longest 1st place streak was in 2016/17 (3 in a row).
 South Africa's longest podium streak was in 2016/17 (7 in a row).
 South Africa's longest defending streak was in South Africa sevens, after successfully defending 3 titles in a row from 2013 to 2015.
 South Africa's worst result was in Hong Kong in 2013. South Africa lost against Wales, Australia and Argentina in the group stage, in the Bowl QF they won against Spain (14–28), but lost to England in the SF.
 South Africa has won 21 out of 89 titles (2006–2016). That's a 23.6% win rate.

References 

World